Gull Island Light is a lighthouse on Gull Island, one of the Apostle Islands, in Lake Superior in northern Wisconsin, in Ashland County, Wisconsin USA. The lighthouse was constructed in 1928 and is currently owned by the Coast Guard. Both grounds and tower are closed.

History 
In 1906 the United States Congress was notified by the Lighthouse Board that a light was required to warn ships of the dangerous ledge protruding from the island for about three and a half miles. After consulting the Department of Commerce, who agreed that it would be an appropriate place for a lighthouse, Congress dispatched a survey team to judge the area. In 1908, the captain of the survey team announced that the eastern end of Michigan Island would be a better place for a light, and an extra $15,000 should be added to the existing $85,000 cost. On June 17, 1918, Congress agreed to place a light on the eastern end of Michigan Island.

Meanwhile, in Pennsylvania an automated pole light had recently been built to replace the  skeletal tower. United States Lighthouse Service (the successors of the Lighthouse Board) judged the tower to be in great condition, and proposed to disassemble and ship it to Michigan Island. In 1928 Congress agreed on the construction of a light on Gull Island, and work began on assembling the skeletal tower on Michigan Island and on Gull Island.

Current structure and display 
The structure is a  black iron pyramidal skeletal tower. It is produced by a 12 Volt  solar powered optic.

Getting there 
Gull Island Light is owned by the Coast Guard, and the Apostle Island Cruise Service water taxi does not offer any cruises that pass Gull Island. A private boat is the only way to view the light.

See also 
Apostle Islands Lighthouses

Notes

Further reading 

 Havighurst, Walter (1943) The Long Ships Passing: The Story of the Great Lakes, Macmillan Publishers.
 Oleszewski, Wes, Great Lakes Lighthouses, American and Canadian: A Comprehensive Directory/Guide to Great Lakes Lighthouses, (Gwinn, Michigan: Avery Color Studios, Inc., 1998) .
 
 Wright, Larry and Wright, Patricia, Great Lakes Lighthouses Encyclopedia Hardback (Erin: Boston Mills Press, 2006) .

Lighthouses in Ashland County, Wisconsin